The OTS-02 Kiparis (ОЦ-02 Кипарис, Russian for "cypress") submachine gun was designed by the TsKIB SOO design bureau of Tula during the early 1970s but was not introduced into service until 1991. It is primarily intended for internal security and police units, it was adopted by the Russian police and MVD (Ministry of internal affairs).

Design details
The OTS-02 is a blowback-operated weapon of a conventional design chambered in 9×18mm Makarov.

The receiver is made from pressed steel with a synthetic plastic pistol grip. It feeds from stamped steel detachable straight box magazines, inserted into a well in front of the trigger guard with either a 20 or 30-round cartridge capacity.

The weapon has a rudimentary steel skeletonized stock which folds up and over the receiver when folded, in such a manner that the simple base plate outline extends downwards to either side of the muzzle. The Kiparis is supplied with a proprietary sound suppressor with a service life of approximately 6,000 rounds, the same service life as the barrel.

The OTS-02 Kiparis can also accommodate a red dot sight or a tactical laser pointer which clips on forward of the magazine housing in such a way that the bottom of the laser aiming device can act as a forward grip during aiming.

Variants
 OTS-02 (ОЦ-02 "Кипарис")
 OTS-02-1 (ОЦ-02-1) - SMG with an integrated silencer, chambered for 9×18 mm PM
 GMC-700 - non-lethal gas pistol for private security agencies, only 30 were made

Users
 : Used by special forces
 : Ministry of Internal Affairs, security guards of the Central Bank of The Russian Federation and security guards of the Sberbank and other law enforcement

See also
List of Russian weaponry
MPA
Škorpion

Notes

External links

KBP Instrument Design Bureau – official page
- Modern Firearms

Submachine guns of the Soviet Union
Cold War firearms of the Soviet Union
9×18mm Makarov submachine guns
TsKIB SOO products
Weapons and ammunition introduced in 1972